Adam David Goldberg (born August 12, 1980) is a former American football offensive tackle. He was signed by the Minnesota Vikings of the National Football League (NFL) in 2003, played for the Vikings from 2003 to 2005, and played for the St. Louis Rams from 2006 to 2011. He played college football at Wyoming.

Early years
Goldberg was born in Edina, Minnesota. His father is Jewish, and he considers himself Jewish, despite having been raised as Catholic (his mother's Christian faith).

At Edina High School, Goldberg, referred to as "Barch" and "El Barcho Solamente," was a Second-team All-State and All-Metro selection his senior season. He played both offensive and defensive line. His senior season, he recorded 95 tackles (19 solo) and 76 assists.

College career
Goldberg is a University of Wyoming graduate. He became only the third junior in University of Wyoming football history to be elected a team captain when he was voted a captain by his teammates in the spring of 2001. He was Honorable Mention All-America and two-time First-team All-Mountain West Conference. He started 44 of 45 career games. He graduated with a finance degree.

Professional career

Minnesota Vikings
Goldberg spent 2003 season on Minnesota Vikings. practice squad. In 2004, he started the last six games of the season and two postseason contests. In 2005, he started 12 games at right tackle.

St. Louis Rams
On September 2, 2006, the Vikings traded Goldberg to the St. Louis Rams for the seventh-round selection (209th overall) in the 2008 NFL Draft. In 2006, he played in final 15 games of the season with two starts for the Rams.

The following season, 2007, he played in four games with two starts before being placed on reserve/injured list with a left knee injury suffered in Week 4. An unrestricted free agent in the 2009 offseason, Goldberg was re-signed by the Rams on March 20, 2009, to a two-year, $1.8 million contract.

See also
List of select Jewish football players

References

External links
St. Louis Rams bio

1980 births
American football offensive guards
American football offensive tackles
Living people
Minnesota Vikings players
Sportspeople from Edina, Minnesota
Players of American football from Minnesota
St. Louis Rams players
Wyoming Cowboys football players
Jewish American sportspeople
Edina High School alumni
21st-century American Jews